Lu Shuming (15 August 1956 – 1 November 2022) was a Chinese actor best known for his role as Guan Yu on the 1994 television series Romance of the Three Kingdoms, and also garnered recognition for his roles as Bull Demon King and Li Guang on A Chinese Odyssey (1995)  and The Emperor in Han Dynasty (2005), respectively.

Biography 
Lu was born in Qingdao, Shandong, on 15 August 1956, while his ancestral home is in Yantai. Due to his father having participated in supporting the construction of the northwest China, they relocated to Weinan and then Xi'an in Shaanxi province, where he attended Xi'an Road Primary School and Jiefang Road Middle School. At school, he loved basketball and Beijing Opera.

Lu began his acting career in 1980, when he was accepted to Shaanxi Provincial Drama Troupe, but soon he was forced to leave the stage for falling in love with an actress.

In 1983, Lu was cast as Li Hu in Man in the Desert, making his television debut. In the same year, the Communist government began to crack down on people with "Bad Style". Lu was jailed for 16 months for "mental pollution", a "crime" originated from when he danced seven or eight times at his friend's uncle's house. He went on to appear in other works, including Sing a Romantic Song for You (1986), Exterminate the Banditi in Western Hunan (1986), and Bleak Youth (1988). 

In 1989, he was cast as Qin Shi Huang in A Terra-Cotta Warrior, opposite Zhang Yimou and Gong Li.  

Lu gained national fame for his starring role as Guan Yu in the 1994 television series Romance of the Three Kingdoms, adapted from Luo Guanzhong's classical novel of the same title. 

He co-starred with Stephen Chow and Ng Man-tat in the 1995 film A Chinese Odyssey as Bull Demon King. 

In 2005, he acted in the historical television series The Emperor in Han Dynasty, playing the role of general Li Guang. That same year, he starred with Du Yulu in The Rice is Ripe. 

In 2019, he appeared in Battle Between Song and Liao Dynastles, a historical war film starring Siqin Gaowa. 

Lu played a supporting role in the comedy film Stop! Thieves, starring Bruce Leung, Lawrence Ng and Rain Lee and directed by Jacky Zheng. 

Personal life and death 
Lu married opera singer Gao Lan, with whom he had a son and a daughter.

On 1 November 2022, Lu died due to sudden illness in Xi'an, Shaanxi, at the age of 66.

Filmography

Film

Television

Stages

Song
 A Pot of Old Wine (2015)

Book

References 

1956 births
2022 deaths
People from Qingdao
Chinese film actors
Chinese male singers
Chinese television actors